The 43rd Sports Emmy Awards were presented by the National Academy of Television Arts and Sciences (NATAS), honoring the best in American sports television coverage in 2021. The ceremony took place in-person for the first time in three years, at the Jazz at Lincoln Center's Frederick P. Rose Hall.

The nominations were announced on April 6, 2022. ESPN was the most nominated network with 40 nominations while NFL 360 received more nominations than any other program with 12. American sports broadcaster and television personality Lesley Visser became the first female recipient of the Lifetime Achievement Award.

Winners and nominees

The nominees were announced on April 6, 2022. The winners were announced on May 24, 2022.

Lifetime Achievement Award
 Lesley Visser

Programming

Personality

Technical

Multiple wins

Multiple nominations

References

External links
 Daytime Emmys website

 043
Sports Emmy Awards
Emmy Awards